4:44 is a 2017 album by Jay-Z.

4:44 may refer to:

Music
 4:44 Tour, a 2017 live tour in support of the album
 "4:44" (song), a song by Jay-Z from the album of the same name
 "4:44", a 2019 song by Park Bom

Other
 4:44 Last Day on Earth, a 2011 film directed by Abel Ferrara

See also 
 444 (disambiguation)
 4:4:4 (disambiguation)

Date and time disambiguation pages